Miłosz Jankowski (born 17 January 1990) is a Polish competitive rower.

He competed at the 2016 Summer Olympics in Rio de Janeiro, in the men's lightweight double sculls.

References

1990 births
Living people
Polish male rowers
Olympic rowers of Poland
Rowers at the 2016 Summer Olympics
People from Iława
World Rowing Championships medalists for Poland